Candlewood Suites is a hotel chain within the InterContinental Hotels Group (IHG).

History 
The Candlewood Suites chain was started in 1995 by Jack Deboer, founder of the Residence Inn and co-founder of the Summerfield Suites chain. The first hotel was built on North Webb Road in Wichita, Kansas, United States, and opened in 1996.

The brand's locations are extended-stay hotels focused primarily on rate-sensitive business travelers, also known as corporate transient travelers. Typically corporate transient travelers stay only during the week, leaving the occupancy of the subject hotels lower during the weekend. However, with true extended-stay business being over seven days, and often beyond 30 days, it allows the hotel to maintain a higher occupancy average overall. While this occupancy generally comes with a lower average rate or average daily rate (ADR), the revenue per available room sold (RevPAR) is typically higher as a result of the significantly higher occupancy and penetration rate within the respective markets.

Typical amenities provided by Candlewood in line with brand standards and according to the IHG website include spacious suites with fully equipped kitchenettes, free local calls, voice mail, data ports, and two phone lines; an on-site convenience store with food items at a low price (the Candlewood Cupboard); a free entertainment library of CD's and videos available at the front desk; complimentary guest laundry; a free 24-hour exercise facility; free fax service; and an outdoor barbecue gazebo.  Candlewood Suites does not offer a free continental breakfast, however, a “brown bag" breakfast is available for purchase consisting of fruit, a granola bar, and a beverage via the Candlewood Cupboard. Also common to the Candlewood brand is a lack of swimming pool or extensive amounts of meeting space or expansive lobby. 

Consistent with the extended-stay business, housekeeping staff and expense are greatly reduced with the operations of this type of hotel since daily room cleanings are not provided to extended-stay guests.

From 1995 to 2003, Candlewood Hotel Company franchised and managed hotels throughout the US. In January 2004, Candlewood Suites was acquired by IHG. As of September 30, 2007, there were 151 Candlewood Suites hotels currently open, with 187 hotels in the pipeline, with an estimated 50 of these hotels opening during 2007. There are now 342 locations worldwide. Candlewood competes with other value-priced, extended-stay hotels such as TownePlace Suites and Mainstay Suites.

References

External links

Extended stay hotel chains
Hotel chains in the United States
Hotels established in 1995
InterContinental Hotels Group brands